Lynne Griffin (born 17 September 1952) is a Canadian actress. She is known for her work in film, television and stage, particularly her appearances in the horror films Black Christmas (1974) and Curtains (1983), and a recurring role on the television series Wind at My Back (1996–2001).

Early life
Griffin was born in Toronto, Ontario, the daughter of Kay, an actress, and James Joseph Griffin, a fashion photographer and soccer player. She is married to fellow actor Sean Sullivan.

Filmography

Films

Television series

Television movies

Theatre 
 Stratford Shakespeare Festival
 Shaw Festival
 2002: Resurgence Theatre Company - Romeo and Juliet, The Tempest

Awards

In 1980 Griffin earned an Outstanding Performance by an Actress (Non-Feature) Genie Award nomination for her role in Every Person is Guilty.

References

External links
Six for Her Scythe: An Interview with Lynne Griffin
Lynne Griffin profile on northernstars.ca

1952 births
Actresses from Toronto
Canadian film actresses
Canadian television actresses
Living people